Rustington may refer to:

Rustington
Rustington F.C.
Rustington (electoral division)
Rustington (hymn)